Starship Troopers is a 1959 novel by Robert Heinlein.

Starship Troopers may also refer to:

Works derived from the novel

Film and television
 Starship Troopers (OVA), a 1988 Japanese anime
 Starship Troopers (franchise), a media franchise based on the novel, including:
 Starship Troopers (film), a 1997 live-action film directed by Paul Verhoeven loosely based on the book
 Starship Troopers 2: Hero of the Federation, a 2004 live-action sequel
 Starship Troopers 3: Marauder, a 2008 live-action sequel film
 Starship Troopers: Invasion, a 2012 animated sequel film
 Starship Troopers: Traitor of Mars, a 2017 animated sequel film
 Roughnecks: Starship Troopers Chronicles, a computer animated TV show set in the same universe as the book

Games
 Starship Troopers (video game), 2005 
 Starship Troopers (board wargame)
 Starship Troopers: The Roleplaying Game
 Starship Troopers: The Miniatures Game
 Starship Troopers: Terran Ascendancy
 Starship Troopers (pinball)

Other uses
 "Starship Trooper", a song by Yes
 space marine, also called starship trooper

See also

 Spacetrooper
 
 
 
 Starship (disambiguation)
 Trooper (disambiguation)
 Sky trooper (disambiguation)